Jan Theunisz Blanckerhoff or Jan Maat, (10 January 1628, Alkmaar – buried 2 October 1669, Amsterdam) was a Dutch Golden Age marine painter.

Biography
He was taught by the Alkmaar painter Arent Teerling, and later by Pieter Scheyenburg and still later again by Cesar van Everdingen, who encouraged him to travel. He became a member of the Bentvueghels in Rome and was given the bent name Jan Maat. He started on landscapes but switched to seascapes.

According to Houbraken, his most popular pieces were of Italian ports with strange boats moored here. He had a student, in Amsterdam, who followed his style.

References

External links

1628 births
1669 deaths
Dutch Golden Age painters
Dutch male painters
Dutch marine artists
People from Alkmaar
Members of the Bentvueghels